Effutu Municipal District is one of the twenty-two districts in Central Region, Ghana. Originally it was formerly part of the then-larger Awutu/Effutu/Senya District in 1988, until the southwest part of the district was split off by a decree of president John Agyekum Kufuor on 29 February 2008 to create Awutu Senya District; thus the remaining part was elevated to municipal district assembly status to become Effutu Municipal District on that same year. The municipality is located in the southeast part of Central Region and has Winneba as its capital town.

List of settlements

Sources
 
 District: Effutu Municipal District

References

Central Region (Ghana)

Districts of the Central Region (Ghana)